Nordlund is a surname of Swedish origin which may refer to:

People
 Barbro Hietala Nordlund (born 1946), Swedish Social Democratic politician
 Ingar Nordlund (1922–1998), Norwegian speed skater
 John Filip Nordlund (1875–1900), Swedish criminal
 Roger Nordlund (born 1957), Åland politician
 Solveig Nordlund (born 1943), Portuguese filmmaker
 Tina Nordlund (born 1977), Swedish footballer
 Willfred Nordlund (born 1988), Norwegian politician

Other
6184 Nordlund, a main-belt Asteroid
Camp Nordland, a resort in Andover, New Jersey

Swedish-language surnames